Oskari Lehtinen (born 9 February 1994) is a Finnish ice hockey player. His is currently playing with SaiPa in the Finnish Liiga.

Lehtinen made his Liiga debut playing with Ässät during the 2013–14 Liiga season.

References

External links

1994 births
Living people
Ässät players
Finnish ice hockey left wingers
HPK players
Sportspeople from Turku
SaiPa players